The Kh-38/Kh-38M is a family of air-to-surface missiles meant to succeed the Kh-25 and Kh-29 missile families.

Design and development

The basic configuration of the Kh-38M was revealed at the 2007 Moscow Air Show (MAKS). The first prototypes of the missile had initially folding wings and tail fins for internal carriage, and would have a variety of seeker heads for different variants. Different warheads (fragmentation, cluster munitions, penetrating) can also be fitted. The Kh-38M is meant to succeed the Kh-25 and Kh-29 missile families. It can be used by combat aircraft such as the Sukhoi Su-34 and Sukhoi Su-57, and it is planned to be integrated on the Kamov Ka-52K helicopter. The first test firing took place in 2010 from a Su-34, and production was ordered to start in 2015.

In a successive version, unveiled at MAKS 2017, both control surfaces were replaced by longer and narrower fixed ones, a solution similar to the one used in the Selenia Aspide missile.

Operational history
The Kh-38M was first used in combat during the Russian military intervention in the Syrian civil war.

Variants
Kh-38MA - inertial, active radar homing
Kh-38MK - inertial, satellite guidance
Kh-38ML - inertial, semi-active laser guidance
Kh-38MT - inertial, imaging infrared guidance

Grom-E1 AS-23 tactical cruise missile derivative/ AGM Air to Surface with 120 km range
Grom-E2 AS-23B / KAB- guided bomb gliding 50-km range version
≈600 kg, various aim guidance, both created on the base of Kh-38M short-range tactical missile and also have a modular structure, warheads and seekers. First seen at MAKS 2015, intended to equip all types of fighters, including the MiG-35 and Su-57.

See also
Kh-25
AGM-65 Maverick
Joint Air-to-Ground Missile
Brimstone

References

External links

 Manufacturer information of the Kh-38
 KTRV finalises development of Grom air-to-surface munition variants

Air-to-surface missiles of Russia
Tactical Missiles Corporation products
Military equipment introduced in the 2010s